The Vanishing Prairie is a 1954 American documentary film directed by James Algar and released by Walt Disney Productions.

The theme music was given a set of lyrics by Hazel "Gil" George. It was rechristened as "Pioneer's Prayer" in Westward Ho, the Wagons!, a western film about pioneers on the Oregon Trail.

The Vanishing Prairie was released on video in 1985, and 1993 in United States.

Synopsis

Cast

Awards
 5th Berlin International Film Festival: Big Gold Medal (Documentaries and Culture Films)
 Academy Award for Best Documentary Feature (1954)

References

External links
 
 Information at Disney.com
 

1954 films
Best Documentary Feature Academy Award winners
Films shot in Oregon
Documentary films about nature
Disney documentary films
1950s English-language films
American documentary films
Films directed by James Algar
1954 documentary films
Films produced by Ben Sharpsteen
Films produced by Walt Disney
Films scored by Paul Smith (film and television composer)
Walt Disney Pictures films
Films with screenplays by Winston Hibler
1950s American films